Perplex City was an alternate reality game created by the London-based developer Mind Candy under the direction of the lead producer and designer, Adrian Hon, that ran from April 2005 to February 2007. The first "season" of the game had players looking for "The Receda Cube" (referred to as "the Cube"), a priceless scientific and spiritual artifact to the people of a fictional metropolis known as "Perplex City", which had been stolen and buried somewhere on Earth.

The game offered a cash prize of £100,000 (approximately $130,000 or €115,000) to the person who found the cube. The Cube was found by Andy Darley of Middlesex, UK in a wooded area in Northamptonshire, UK on February 2, 2007.

Mind Candy sold foil packs of puzzle cards to fund the game. Each card featured a different puzzle, and although the cards provided additional story lore, it was possible to participate in the ARG without purchasing them. According to Mind Candy, the first wave of cards for the new game season, called Perplex City Stories, were to be released on March 1, 2007. In June 2007, they announced that the second season was on indefinite hold.

Background

Perplex City 

Perplex City is a massive fictitious metropolis that has an unknown number of connections to Earth and several futuristic elements, including, advanced mobile technology, neuro-enhancing pharmaceuticals, and kilometer-high skyscrapers. There is also a slightly more utopian element to city life than is commonly found on Earth. Puzzles and mental pursuits are characteristic, and deeply rooted in the city's culture. Their leading competitive event, the Academy Games, is primarily a competition of intellectual skills rather than physical strength. In fact, nearly every part of their culture touches upon both the cryptic and mental aspects.

Their religion falls loosely around a mythology of buildings, constructions, and technology, none of which are explicitly theistic. The Cube is a sacred and holy object. It possesses a range of unusual properties that many people in this fictitious world believe to be of supernatural origin.

Citizens of Perplex City 
Key figures in city life include Sente Kiteway, Master of The Academy, an advanced learning institution in the city, and former custodian of the Cube. His two daughters, Scarlett and Violet, communicate regularly with the people of Earth through their blogs. Pietro Salk, an investigative reporter for the city's leading newspaper The Sentinel, produced many leads before he was unceremoniously killed oor getting too close to the truth. The team at the Academy tasked with returning the Cube (and ostensibly authors of the puzzle cards) are also frequently in touch, along with Kurt McAllister, an important ally to players on Earth.

Plot 
An artifact called the Reseda Cube (pronounced /Reh-kay-duh/) is stolen from the Perplex City Academy and makes its way to Earth. A Cube Retrieval Team (CRT) is formed to search for the Cube. Because the citizens of Perplex City are unable to travel to Earth, the Master of the Perplex City Academy, Sente Kiteway, asks the citizens of Earth for help in finding the Cube and offers to share leads or clues that he or the CRT may get.

Clues to the location of the Cube are periodically left by the person who stole it, known only as Combed Thunderclap. It is discovered that an organization called the Third Power and a Cube-worshipping cult called the Reconstructionists are also looking for the Cube. While the people of Earth are left to search for the Cube on Earth, various citizens of Perplex City, particularly Kurt McAllister and Sente’s two daughters, Scarlett and Violet, attempt to find additional clues in Perplex City and to discover the identity of Combed Thunderclap. The latter three discover the lab in which the Cube was made. They find that the Cube was built by Sente and can be used as a weapon and a teleporter. The Cube is finally found by the people of Earth in Northamptonshire, England; they also determine that it was Violet who stole the Cube and hid it on Earth, in an effort to keep it out of the hands of the Third Power.

Puzzle cards

Mind Candy sold a series of collectible puzzle cards in foil packs. Each pack contained six random cards from a total of 256 possible cards. Cards were divided into sets and subsets of varying rarity and difficulty.

Unlike collectible card games such as Magic: The Gathering or Pokémon, the cards are not designed for competitive player-versus-player "combat." Instead, each card depicts a different puzzle, with the rarer cards also featuring more complex riddles. Cards were marked with unique identifiers, which could then be entered onto the Perplex City website, earning points and a place on a leaderboard. Many cards contained hidden features, such as ultraviolet or heat-sensitive inks, and they covered a broad range of them,es from pop-culture trivia to cryptography and logic brainteasers.

Each card was a member of a four-card set. If all four cards were solved by a player, they received double points for each card in the set.

Notable cards 
 Riemann (S1, Card #238) asks players to prove the Riemann hypothesis. However, the Perplex City website could not possibly have validated such a proof. This is currently the only remaining unsolved card.
 Billion to One (S1, Card #256) features the face of a man, with a caption in Japanese that reads 私を見つけなさい, which translates to "Find Me." A hint line for the game gave the further clue, "My name is Satoshi." His image was spread via social networking sites, in an attempt to locate and make contact with this person, as an experiment in exploring the concept of Six degrees of separation. The card was solved in December 2020 when the man in question was found by Tom-Lucas Säger and reported to Laura E. Hall, who ran the website tracking information about the hunt. In an email, Satoshi explained that the original concept had been for him to ask a question of whoever found him. Since he had forgotten the question, the puzzle author Jey Biddulph posted a recording of the spoken question on SoundCloud: it was, "Who died after giving birth to flames?", with the answer "Izanami".

Out of print cards 
Two cards are no longer in circulation. The cards were excluded from wave-three print runs because they did not fit on the print layout. While these problems have been rectified, Mind Candy has no plans to replace or reprint these cards in the future. They are:
Card #238 (Riemann) - chosen to be excluded due to the complete inability of the card to be solved for the foreseeable future.
Card #245 (Relativity) - chosen to be excluded more or less at random, but the decision was likely influenced by the fact that the problem and solution are quite complex.

ARG features 
The puzzle cards are intended as an introduction to the characters and story of Perplex City itself and the deeper mysteries of the Cube theft. Clues found on the cards direct players to various websites, blogs, emails, phone calls, and SMS messages originating from Perplex City. These often feature puzzles of their own, whose solutions lead to further puzzles.  Frequently, these puzzles require players to co-operate in reaching various goals.

Perplex City has been running since late 2004, much longer than the traditional ARG. Its longevity has allowed for a number of events that simply would not be possible within the traditional two-month lifespan of an ARG. Some examples of this include:

 Players wrote a book to enable a character to become a "published author" and gain access to relevant archives.
 A full-length CD of cryptic techno music was released by a Perplexian musician.
 A banner plane flew across Manchester with a keyword that enabled access to a new area of the game.
 Sixty players attended an in-game event in search of clues, only for one of their own to be revealed as a mole and escape in a black helicopter.
 220 people participated in the first Perplex City Academy Games in London, a high-tech scavenger hunt across the capital. A month later, a similar event was held in New York.

Board Game 
In late 2006, Mind Candy released Perplex City: The Board Game. Players solve anagrams, logic problems, visual puzzles, and trivia questions to collect a set of colored stones. Players can also challenge one another for their collected stones. To win, the last stone must be collected by challenging another player.

The rules insert maintains an in-universe approach to Perplex City, giving background about its puzzle-loving citizens and a fictional history of the board game.

Mind Candy 
The Mind Candy cards were first released in select outlets around the world, but are increasingly readily available from retailers both on- and offline. On September 7, 2006, Mind Candy announced that GameStop was to begin carrying Perplex City cards in 700 stores in the United States. As of September 26, 2006, some 682,425 cards have been marked as solved on the Perplex City leaderboard, with 45,215 players registered.

Mind Candy received a round of venture capital worth $3 million from Index Ventures, an investor in Skype and other technology companies.

In June 2007 Mind Candy announced that it would be putting season 2 of its ARG on hold indefinitely. Mind Candy's focus later moved to the Moshi Monsters franchise and the Perplex City project was abandoned.

Reception
A reviewer from the online second volume of the gaming magazine Pyramid stated that "The object of the game is, well . . . that depends. The whole game is incremental. At its simplest, the idea is to solve the poser on a card. If you want to become 200,000 very real dollars richer (apparently they can do bank transfers across the dimensional gulf), you need to suck as much information as you can out of as many sources as you can, including the cards, some scattered websites, and even real people (or their cell phones), to unlock where on Earth the Cube has been hidden."

Reviews
Pyramid - Season 2

See also 
 Alternate reality game
 Masquerade (book)
 Eric Harshbarger, Perplex City puzzle designer
 Andrea Phillips, Perplex City writer & designer
 Naomi Alderman, Perplex City writer

References

External links
User-run catalog of all available puzzle cards
Wiki Project

Alternate reality games
Puzzles